There are 132 listed buildings (Swedish: byggnadsminne) in Östergötland County.

Boxholm Municipality

Finspång Municipality

Kinda Municipality

Linköping Municipality

Hemslöjdshuset, Linköping
Rhyzeliusgårdens medeltidshus

Mjölby Municipality

Motala Municipality

Norrköping Municipality

Söderköping Municipality

Vadstena Municipality

Valdemarsvik Municipality

Ydre Municipality

Åtvidaberg Municipality

Ödeshög Municipality

External links

  Bebyggelseregistret

Listed buildings in Sweden